

This is a list of the National Register of Historic Places listings in Madison County, Florida.

This is intended to be a complete list of the properties on the National Register of Historic Places in Madison County, Florida, United States. The locations of National Register properties for which the latitude and longitude coordinates are included below, may be seen in a map.

There are 8 properties listed on the National Register in the county.

Current listings

|}

See also

 List of National Historic Landmarks in Florida
 National Register of Historic Places listings in Florida

References

 
Madison County